Addisyn Jade Merrick (born March 4, 1998) is an American soccer player who plays as a defender for the Kansas City Current of the National Women's Soccer League (NWSL).

Club career
Merrick made her professional debut for the North Carolina Courage on June 27, 2020, in the 2020 NWSL Challenge Cup against Portland Thorns FC.

On November 12, 2020, Merrick was selected by Racing Louisville FC in the 2020 NWSL Expansion Draft. She made her Racing debut on June 23 against her former club, but she only appeared in three matches before suffering an ankle injury.

Merrick returned to full health in time for the 2022 NWSL Challenge Cup, starting the first five matches of the competition. She made two starts for Racing Louisville in the regular season with a notable start against San Diego resulting in a win.

Merrick was traded to the Kansas City Current along with Cece Kizer on June 9, 2022. Making her Kansas City debut on June 11, 2022 against the Gotham FC subbing in for Victoria Pickett in the 61’. She made her first start for the Current on July 10, 2022 against the Washington Spirit.

References

External links
 Kansas Jayhawks profile
 
 

Living people
People from Lee's Summit, Missouri
Soccer players from Missouri
American women's soccer players
Women's association football defenders
North Carolina Courage players
National Women's Soccer League players
North Carolina Courage draft picks
Kansas Jayhawks women's soccer players
1998 births
African-American women's soccer players
Racing Louisville FC players
21st-century African-American sportspeople
21st-century African-American women